The Copa Albion de Caridad was a Uruguayan football cup competition organized by the Uruguayan Football Association from 1916 to 1921.

All the clubs of the Uruguayan Primera División participated and it had a knockout format.

List of champions

Titles by club

References

H
Recurring sporting events established in 1916
1921 disestablishments in Uruguay
1916 establishments in Uruguay